TMU can refer to:
 Taipei Medical University, Taiwan
 Tambor Airport, in Costa Rica (IATA code)
 Tarbiat Modares University, Tehran, Iran
 Teerthanker Mahaveer University, Moradabad, India
 Tetramethylurea, a chemical compound
 Texas Methodist University, a fictional university on the TV series Friday Night Lights
 Texture mapping unit in computer graphics processing
 The Master's University, in Santa Clarita, California
 Tianjin Medical University, China
 Time Measurement Unit (0.036 seconds), in predetermined motion time systems
 Tokyo Metropolitan University, Japan
 Toronto Metropolitan University, Canada
 TrackMania United, a racing game
 Tuen Mun stop, in Hong Kong (MTR station code)